Allacapan, officially the Municipality of Allacapan (Ibanag: Ili nat Allacapan;), is a 3rd class municipality in the province of Cagayan, Philippines. According to the 2020 census, it has a population of 35,234 people.

Allacapan is situated in the north-western periphery of Cagayan, bordering Apayao. It is the headquarters of GV Florida Transport.

Etymology
The municipality's name came to be when Francisco Umengan, an ex-municipal president from Aparri, was annoyed by the skittering of dried leaves heaped within the vicinity. On his inquiry about the significance of the noise, his Negrito guide told him "alla-appan" meaning "trap." Umengan then named the place "Allacapan" and the name has remained to the present.

History

Allacapan has its beginning as a small village in the jungle vastness, inhabited by Negritoes, also known as Aetas. Ilocanos mainly from Ilocos Sur, among them future town mayor Santos Martinez, discovered it in quest for better land and eventually dominated the area.

In 1926, Allacapan was founded as a municipal district of Tauit, sub-province of Apayao, Mountain Province. On June 30, 1927, acting Governor General Eugene A. Gilmore issued Executive Order No. 68, separating the Allacapan area from Tauit and organizing them into an independent municipal district under the same name, to be effective the following day. It was ceded to Cagayan in 1928 and became a regular municipality in 1945 by virtue of Commonwealth Act No. 590 authored by Rep. Miguel Pio.

The history of Allacapan has a series of existing episodes and transitions. During the Japanese occupation, the Japanese forces established a garrison in the heart of the community from where echoed moans of torture inflicted upon prisoners of war, most often, innocent civilians. Later on, the Japanese burned the municipal hall, including the school building in the old site of Daan-Ili. The incident aggravated the fear of the civilians and they fled to the mountains.

After liberation, disgruntled ex-Army men who were not satisfied with their backpay checks took to the hills with their rifles and joined the underground movement. Allacapan then became a hotbed of the Huks (HUKBALAHAP or Hukbo ng Bayan Laban sa Hapon). Their atrocities resulted in the kidnapping of then Mayor Agustin Gorospe in September 1951, the burning of the newly constructed town hall, and the looting of the local treasury.

The construction of the highway from Magapit, Lallo to Bangag, Aparri traversing Allacapan and the opening of the Magapit Bridge to traffic, facilitated mobility of trade and commerce. Allacapan suddenly became a local point. It is now accessible from all points and is fast becoming an urban community.

Geography

Barangays
Allacapan is politically subdivided into 27 barangays. These barangays are headed by elected officials: Barangay Captain, Barangay Council, whose members are called Barangay Councilors. All are elected every three years.

Climate

Demographics

Economy

Government
Allacapan, belonging to the second legislative district of the province of Cagayan, is governed by a mayor designated as its local chief executive and by a municipal council as its legislative body in accordance with the Local Government Code. The mayor, vice mayor, and the councilors are elected directly by the people through an election which is being held every three years.

Elected officials

Education
The Schools Division of Cagayan governs the town's public education system. The division office is a field office of the DepEd in Cagayan Valley region. The office governs the public and private elementary and public and private high schools throughout the municipality.

References

External links
[ Philippine Standard Geographic Code]
Philippine Census Information
Allacapan, Cagayan North
Allacapan Online Social Group

Municipalities of Cagayan